George Courtauld (11 August 1830 – 29 February 1920) was an English cloth manufacturer and Liberal politician who sat in the House of Commons from 1878 to 1885.

Courtauld was the son of George Courtauld of Bocking, Essex. He was educated at University College, London and became a partner in the firm of Samuel Courtauld & Co which had been established by his grandfather George Courtauld. He was a Justice of the Peace for Essex.

In December 1878 Courtauld was elected at a by-election as the Liberal Member of Parliament (MP) for Maldon. He held the seat until 1885. He was a Unitarian and supported social reform and suffrage extension.

Courtauld married firstly Mina Bromley, daughter of Walter Bromley of Clapton in 1855, and secondly Susanna Elizabeth Savill, daughter of S W Savill of Bocking in 1864, and married again in 1888. He and his wives had in total 13 children. His eldest daughter was Katharine Courtauld.

Courtauld died at the age of 89.

References

External links

1830 births
1920 deaths
Liberal Party (UK) MPs for English constituencies
UK MPs 1874–1880
UK MPs 1880–1885
Alumni of University College London
English businesspeople
British textile industry businesspeople
George
People from Bocking, Essex
Members of Parliament for Maldon
English people of French descent